Hervás is a Spanish surname. Notable people with the surname include:

 Francisco Hervás  (born in 1962), volleyballer
 Francisco Hervás (born 1981), swimmer
Javier Hervás (born 1989), Spanish footballer
Lorenzo Hervás y Panduro (1735–1809), Spanish Jesuit and philologist
Manu Hervás (born 1986), Spanish footballer

Spanish-language surnames